Zekiye Sultan ("innocent, untainted"; 12 January 1872 – 13 July 1950) was an Ottoman princess, the daughter of Sultan Abdul Hamid II and Bedrifelek Kadın.

Early life and education

Zekiye Sultan was born on 12 January 1872 in the Dolmabahçe Palace. Her father was Abdul Hamid II, son of Abdulmejid I and Tirimüjgan Kadın. Her mother was Bedrifelek Kadın, daughter of Prince Mehmed Karzeg. She was the third child, and second daughter of her father and the second child of her mother. She had two brothers, Şehzade Mehmed Selim, two years elder than her, and Şehzade Ahmed Nuri, six years younger than her. She was one of Abdülhamid's favorite daughters, with Naime Sultan and Ayşe Sultan. 

After Abdul Hamid's accession to the throne on 31 August 1876, the imperial family remained in the Dolmabahçe Palace. In 1877, Zekiye and other members of the imperial family settled in the Yıldız Palace, after Abdul Hamid moved there on 7 April 1877. 

Zekiye began her education in 1879, age seven, at the Ihlamur Pavilion together with her brother Şehzade Mehmed Selim, and Sultan Abdul Aziz's children, Şehzade Mehmed Şevket, Esma Sultan and Şehzade Mehmed Seyfeddin. She studied geography, the Quran, 
and Turkish language. She also read English and French books. She was also taught music. She first took her music education from Lombardi Bey, and following her marriage from Madame Avisnad Bavis, a French. She learnt both Turkish and European music.

Marriage
In 1887, Zekiye was engaged to Ali Nureddin Pasha, eldest son of Gazi Osman Pasha and Zatıgül Hanım, a lady formerly in harem of Sultan Abdulaziz, In 1889, aged seventeen, her father arranged her trousseaux and marriage together with three of Sultan Abdulaziz's daughters, princesses Saliha Sultan, Nazime Sultan, and Esma Sultan. The marriage contract was signed on 15 March 1889 in the Yıldız Palace. Zekiye's deputy was Mehmed Yavar Agha, and witness was Mehmed Cevher Agha. Ali Nureddin's deputy was Grand Vizier Mehmed Kamil Pasha. The wedding took place 20 April 1889 in the Yıldız Palace. 

It was a tradition that princesses were allocated palaces on their marriage. She was allocated the Ortaköy Palace. This palace once belonged to her aunt Mediha Sultan, half-sister of her father, where she resided with her first husband. Zekiye moved to Ortaköy Palace, on the second day after the marriage, where 80 men and 80 women were in their service. In 1898, Ali Nureddin's younger brother, Mehmed Kemaleddin Pasha, married her younger half-sister Naime Sultan. Her palace was constructed next to Zekiye's palace, and the two buildings used to be called "The Twin Mansions".

The two together had two daughters, Ulviye Şükriye Hanımsultan born in 1890, who died at the age of about three on 23 February 1893, and Fatma Aliye Hanımsultan, born in 1891. Fatma Aliye married Mehmed Muhsin Yeğen, member of Egyptian Yeğen family in 1911. The couple had two sons, Osman Hayder Bey born on 5 September 1912, and Salih Zeki Bey born on 4 September 1921. By them, Zekiye had a great granddaughter, Fatma Yasemin Yeğen (b. 18 September 1973) and a great grandson, Muhsin Osman Yegen (b. 14 December 1977).

Zekiye Sultan and Ali Nureddin Pasha esteemed music, and she used to play piano at her mansion. She was also interested in arts. During the month of Ramadan, she fed the poor and provided financial aid to them. She also presented gifts to the guests who came to the Iftar. She participated in various donation campaigns, that made her known as an receptive and benevolent princess. Rumours had it that Nureddin Paşa had met a beautiful Greek Ottoman woman outside Bon Marché in Beyoğlu and that she later became his mistress. The rumours reached Abdülhamid II, who urged Zekiye Sultan to divorce her husband but she refused. Apparently, after a while, the Greek Ottoman woman was killed by the Sultan’s men.

Exile and death

At the exile of the imperial family in March 1924, Zekiye and her family including her husband, daughter, and grandsons settled in Pau, Pyrénées-Atlantiques, France  where the whole family lived in one room in a hotel, which they never paid because the Paşag had been the grandson of Gazi Osman Paşah. Her mother chose to remain in Turkey, in her mansion in Serencebey, where she died in 1930.

According to Neslişah Sultan, she was chubby and had lost most of her hair, and scarcely left the house. She would dress up and wear a blonde wig. She used to collect miniature animals, goats, and flowers, and also ate a lot of sweets.

Zekiye Sultan died on 13 July 1950 in Pau, Pyrénées-Atlantiques, France at the age of seventy-eight, and was buried there. Her husband outlived her by two years, and dying in 1952.

Honours

 Order of the House of Osman
 Order of the Medjidie, Jeweled
 Order of Charity, 1st Class

Issue
By her husband, Zekiye Sultan had two daughters:
 Ulviye Şükriye Hanımsultan (1890 - February 1893). Born and died to Ortaköy Palace, buried to Yahya Efendi cemetery.
 Fatma Aliye Hanımsultan (1891 - 14 April 1972). Born to Ortaköy Palace. In 1911 she married Mehmed Muhsin Bey, of power Egyptian family's Yegen. They had two sons:
Osman Hayder Bey (5 September 1912 - ?). Died without issue. 
Salih Zeki Bey (4 September 1921 - ?). Married, he had a daughter and a son:
Fatma Yasemin Yeğen (b. 18 September 1973)
Muhsin Osman Yegen (b. 14 December 1977)

In popular culture
 In the 2017 TV series Payitaht: Abdülhamid, Zekiye Sultan is portrayed by Turkish actress Tuğçe Kumral.

Ancestry

References

Sources

 
 

1872 births
1950 deaths
Royalty from Istanbul
19th-century Ottoman princesses
20th-century Ottoman princesses